The State University of New York Buffalo State University (colloquially referred to as Buffalo State University, SUNY Buffalo State, Buffalo State, or simply Buff State) is a public university in Buffalo, New York. It is part of the State University of New York (SUNY) system. Buffalo State University was founded in 1871 as the Buffalo Normal School to train teachers. It offers 79 undergraduate majors with 11 honors options, 11 post baccalaureate teacher certification programs, and 64 graduate programs.

History

Eighty-six students attended the Buffalo Normal School on the first day of classes on September 13, 1871. The school's purpose was to provide a uniform training program for teachers to serve Buffalo's fast-growing public school population. Today, Buffalo State remains one of only 136 colleges in the nation to host a teacher-preparation program, but its curricular offerings now include more than 250 undergraduate and graduate programs.

The WWII years were another time of growth for the college; in 1944, the now renowned Special Education program was founded and in 1948, the first dormitory building was erected where the present-day Moot Hall is located. In 1961, Buffalo State was the first institution in the SUNY system to offer a study-abroad program, a semester-long immersion program in Siena, Italy. International study programs now include international exchange and study-abroad programs in Australia, Canada, England, Italy, the Netherlands, Puerto Rico, and Spain.

In 1964, the Buffalo State University Planetarium opened its doors with a 24-foot dome, and Dr. James Orgren became the facility's director in 1966. On November 17, 1978, a fire destroyed the facility, but the community's generosity allowed it to reopen on April 18, 1980. In April 1982, it was renamed the Whitworth Ferguson Planetarium in honor of its greatest benefactor. In 1984, Dr. Orgren hired Mr. Arthur Gielow as his successor. Mr. Gielow died in 2010, and after a brief remodeling, the planetarium reopened in 2011 under the direction of Dr. Kevin Williams. In January 2013, the planetarium hosted a closing ceremony that highlighted its 48-year history. Through 2010–2012, staff members Tim Collins, Stephen Dubois and Terry Farrell created several programs. In 2015, a generous donation allowed the planetarium to reopen with a temporary 20-foot inflatable fulldome system. The new 35-foot dome facility is now open in the Science And Math Complex building.

Campus 
Buffalo state has 29 buildings including student centers, academic buildings, athletics buildings, office buildings, and residence halls. Buffalo State is undergoing a $350 million campus-wide improvement project. In 2011, a $45 million Student Apartment Complex opened on the west side of campus. It is Buffalo State's largest addition to campus student housing since the early 1970s.

A new $38 million Technology Building is expected to achieve LEED gold certification through the U.S. Green Building Council. A $103.4 million renovation and expansion of the Science and Mathematics Complex is under way and is scheduled for completion in 2017. Other campus projects include a $9.5 million renovation on the third floor of Rockwell Hall, $5.6 million renovation to the Campbell Student Union, $28 million rehabilitation of the Houston Gymnasium, $9 million in rehabilitation to the Tower 4 residence hall, and $11.2 million in underground utility replacements in the Rockwell Quadrangle and nearby vicinity.

Academics

Buffalo State has 79 undergraduate majors with 11 honors options and 64 opportunities for graduate study, including 11 teacher certification programs. Fifty-one faculty members have been awarded the SUNY Chancellor's Award for Excellence in Teaching, and seven have been honored as SUNY Distinguished Teaching Professors.

More than 80 percent of all classes at Buffalo State have fewer than 40 students. Classes for undergraduate majors usually have between 12 and 15 students. As of 2016, 49 Buffalo State faculty members have been awarded the SUNY Chancellor's Award for Excellence in Teaching.

Schools
Buffalo State is composed of three schools: the School of Arts and Sciences, the School of Education, and the School of the Professions.

Programs and centers 
Programs available at Buffalo State that are not offered at any other SUNY institution include adult education, applied economics, art conservation, communication design, creativity, fashion and textile technology, fiber design, forensic chemistry, metal/jewelry design, higher education administration, urban and regional planning, and wood/furniture design. Buffalo State was the first school in the world to grant a master of science in creativity. The university also now offers an undergraduate minor in Creative Studies. Both programs are offered through the International Center for Studies in Creativity, which is housed on campus. Buffalo State has 12 centers promoting growth and excellence.

Others include:
 Center for Development of Human Services (CDHS). Strengthening human services through training, organizational, and technical assistance; technology; and evaluation, this center offers a comprehensive menu of management, supervisory, and worker-training programs that enable students to learn to more effectively serve their future clients.
 Center for Health and Social Research. Working as an integral component of Buffalo State to provide collaboration between students, faculty, and staff in intellectual development, this center works to investigate basic and applied research topics that are among the most pressing in today's society.
 Great Lakes Center. This center actively conducts collaborative research with other institutions and agencies in the United States, Canada, and Europe. The research focuses primarily on lakes Erie and Ontario and their tributaries, although national and international projects are also a priority. Research topics include aquatic invasive species, biodiversity and conservation of freshwater mollusks, nutrient stoichiometry and lake budgets, population ecology, water quality, and wetland chemistry and hydrology.

Research 
Through the Research Foundation for the State University of New York, Buffalo State receives more grants and research support than all SUNY colleges and universities combined.

Activities include an annual student research symposium, a summer research fellowship program, a small grants program to support academic-year research, travel support for students presenting or performing at professional meetings and conferences, and faculty development opportunities related to undergraduate research.

Rankings 
Buffalo State was ranked 31 in the category Top Public Schools Regional Universities (North) by U.S. News & World Reports "Best Colleges 2012." When all public and private institutions are included, Buffalo State is ranked 110 in the Top Regional Universities (North) Tier 1, as of 2016. In the same report in 2012, it ranked 73rd nationally for graduate schools in speech-language pathology.
Ranking Web of Universities ranks Buffalo State 4 out of 100 top universities in the Northern Region of the United States and 1,000 out of the top 12,000 in the world. International Colleges & Universities ranks Buffalo State as the 17th best university in New York State out of 145.

Student life

Demographics 
There are 8,082 undergraduates and 1,036 graduate students enrolled. The undergraduate population (Fall 2018) was 43 percent male and 57 percent female. The overall admission rate of new students (2016) was 62 percent. Students both in and out of state, as well as from other countries, are a foundation of the student body; many students hail from the New York City metropolitan area.

Roughly one-quarter of Buffalo State's students live on campus. The university provides a variety of options for its resident students. Some residence halls house first-year students exclusively; some house a mixture of students, and some are reserved for upper-division students. Additionally, there is a mix of specialty housing for specific groups and interests. 

Through the International and Exchange Programs Office, Buffalo State students can study at another campus in the United States, Canada, or around the world. Students have the opportunity to join more than 81 campus organizations, including 22 fraternities and sororities and an International Students Organization (ISO).

United Students Government
United Students Government (USG) represents the student body in campus governance and helps administrate student activities and organizations. USG provides activities, services, and student representation at Buffalo State. USG is headed by an executive branch of students elected each year along with a judicial branch and senate elected at the same time. USG manages and disperses money provided by the mandatory student activity fee to the many organizations and clubs on campus.

Athletics

Buffalo State's sports teams are known as the Bengals. Buffalo State competes in 16 varsity sports within NCAA Division III.

The Bengals men's basketball team won a State University of New York's Athletic Conference championship and advanced to the Sweet 16 in the NCAA Division III Tournament in 2011. In fall 2012, the Bengals football team prevailed in a dramatic upset over the No. 1-ranked University of Wisconsin-Whitewater, breaking into the national rankings for the first time since 2000.

The men's and women's ice hockey teams play in the 1,800-seat Ice Arena within the Buffalo State Sports Arena on campus. The Ice Arena serves as a practice facility for the Buffalo Sabres, has hosted the NJCAA championships, and is also a host site for the Western New York Federation High School Hockey regular season and championship playoffs.

In 2019, the cheerleading team placed 5th at the NCA collegiate national championship in the intermediate DIII division.

Club sports
Buffalo State also has four club sports funded by the United Students Government (USG): men's club hockey, co-ed rowing, men's rugby, and women's rugby.

Greek life 
Buffalo State has an Inter-Greek Association to support the operation of fraternities and sororities on campus. There are 11 fraternities and sororities recognized at Buffalo State.

Media 
BSC-TV Channel 3
WBNY-FM 91.3 (MHz), student-run radio station
The Record, the student-run newspaper, was published every Wednesday. It ceased being a print publication in 2016 and became online only starting in 2017.
The Lens, an art, culture, and literary magazine
1300 Elmwood, magazine for alumni and friends, published biannually

Art 
The campus's Burchfield Penney Art Center, founded in 1966, moved to its new $33 million facility in 2008. The Burchfield Penney features the work of Western New York artists and houses one of the world's largest collections of work by watercolorist Charles E. Burchfield (1893–1967). The historic Albright-Knox Art Gallery, which showcases modern and contemporary art, is located across the street from the campus. Students can purchase discount passes in the Student Union. There are also a number of other art galleries nearby.

Notable people

Buffalo State has 100,000 alumni living in 119 countries throughout the world. Ninety-seven percent live in the United States, and 71 percent live in New York State. The five most popular majors among alumni were elementary education (15,538), art education (4,249), exceptional education (4,180), business studies (3,979), and criminal justice (3,911).
 Susan Bies, former member of the Federal Reserve Board
 Byron Brown, current mayor of the City of Buffalo, New York
 Grover Cleveland, 22nd and 24th president of the United States; member of the first board of directors of the Buffalo Normal School (1870); namesake of Cleveland Hall, the university's administration building
 Patrick B. Burke, member of the New York State Assembly
 Francine DelMonte, former member of the New York State Assembly
 William Conrad III, member of the New York State Assembly
 Beverly Eckert, member of 9/11 Family Steering Committee and co-chair of "Voices of September 11th"; died on Colgan Air Flight 3407
 Diane English, writer, screenwriter, film director
 Tom Fontana, Emmy Award-winning writer and producer
 David Franczyk, member of the Buffalo Common Council
 Bobby Gonzalez, former head coach of the men's basketball program at Seton Hall University
 Brian Higgins, member of the U.S. House of Representatives
 Muriel A. Howard, president of the American Association of State Colleges and Universities, former president of Buffalo State University, and a former vice president of the University at Buffalo.
 Sam Hoyt, Empire State Development regional president; former disgraced member of the New York State Assembly
 Sylvia Hyman (B.A. art education, 1938), ceramic artist
 Carolyn Lamm, partner, White & Case LLP; former president, American Bar Association
 Robert Longo, painter and sculptor
 Gary McNamara former talk host at WGR and WBEN; nationally syndicated talk host, Red Eye Radio, Cumulus Media Networks
 Kevin O'Connell, broadcaster, Channel 2 News, Buffalo
 Sid Parnes, professor, co-founder International Center for Studies in Creativity
 Crystal Davis Peoples-Stokes, New York State assemblywoman, 141st District
 Ralph Raico, history professor and Austrian School economist
 John Rzeznik, lead singer and guitarist of Buffalo-native rock band Goo Goo Dolls; attended one year
 Tom Shannon, disk jockey at WKBW
 Cindy Sherman, photographer, film director and MacArthur Genius recipient
Randy Smith, former NBA player and casino executive host
 Robert E. Wright, Nef Family Chair of Political Economy at Augustana College (South Dakota)

Gallery

References

External links
Official website
Official athletics website

 
Educational institutions established in 1871
State University of New York university colleges
Universities and colleges in Erie County, New York
1871 establishments in New York (state)
Public universities and colleges in New York (state)